Hipermart is a Mexican hypermarket (supermarket) chain owned by the Soriana Organization. The chain opened its first stores in 1989 (San Pedro and Cumbres in Monterrey, and San Lorenzo in Ciudad Juárez). Later, the company opened new stores in Tecnológico in Chihuahua, Independencia and Oriente in Torreón, and Santa María in Monterrey. In 1995, the company was bought out by the Martin families from Torreón and Monterrey, who merged it into Soriana. Almost all the Hipermart stores have been renamed Soriana; only Independencia still operates under the original name.

See also
Soriana (parent's chain)

Supermarkets of Mexico
Retail companies established in 1989
Soriana